Beli (Saturn LXI), provisionally known as S/2004 S 30, is a natural satellite of Saturn. Its discovery was announced by Scott S. Sheppard, David C. Jewitt, and Jan Kleyna on October 7, 2019 from observations taken between December 12, 2004 and March 21, 2007. It was given its permanent designation in August 2021. On 24 August 2022, it was named after Beli, a jötunn from Norse mythology. He is killed by Freyr with the antler of a hart (stag). According to John Lindow, the myth of Beli is partially lost. Some scholars suggest that he may be the brother of Freyr's wife Gerðr, although this is uncertain.

Beli is about 4 kilometres in diameter, and orbits Saturn at an average distance of 20.396 Gm in 1087.84 days, at 157.5° to the ecliptic, in a retrograde direction and with an eccentricity of 0.113.

Due to an error in the initial announcement of Beli, it was announced by the Minor Planet Center with the same orbit as Gerd. The issue was corrected later the same day.

References

Norse group
Irregular satellites
Moons of Saturn
Discoveries by Scott S. Sheppard
Astronomical objects discovered in 2019
Moons with a retrograde orbit